Llanfallteg Track Section is an area displaying Ordovician stratigraphy that is a Site of Special Scientific Interest in Carmarthen & Dinefwr,  Wales.

See also
List of Sites of Special Scientific Interest in Carmarthen & Dinefwr

References

Sites of Special Scientific Interest in Carmarthen & Dinefwr